Chinese in Paris is a 1974 French-Italian comedy film directed by Jean Yanne. The movie features an hypothetical Chinese invasion of western Europe and the life in Paris under communist Chinese rule.

Cast
 Jean Yanne - Régis Forneret
 Nicole Calfan - Stéphanie
 Michel Serrault - Grégoire Montclair
 Kyōzō Nagatsuka - General Pou-Yen
 Jacques François - Hervé Sainfous de Montaubert
 Georges Wilson - Lefranc
 Macha Méril - Madeleine Fontanes
 Bernard Blier - President of France
 Paul Préboist - Civil servant
 Fernand Ledoux - Frugebelle
 Daniel Prévost - Albert Fontanes

References

External links

See also 
 May 68
 Cultural Revolution
 Chinese community in Paris

1970s science fiction comedy films
Films directed by Jean Yanne
French science fiction comedy films
1974 comedy films
1974 films
1970s French-language films
1970s French films